(April 8, 1934 – October 12, 2007) was a leading Japanese architect and one of the founders of the Metabolist Movement.

Biography 
Born in Kanie, Aichi, Kurokawa studied architecture at Kyoto University, graduating with a bachelor's degree in 1957. He then attended University of Tokyo, under the supervision of Kenzo Tange. Kurokawa received a master's degree in 1959. Kurokawa then went on to study for a doctorate of philosophy, but subsequently dropped out in 1964. Kisho Kurokawa was conferred an Honorary Doctorate of Architecture by the Chancellor of Universiti Putra Malaysia (UPM), Malaysia in Sept. 7, 2002.

With colleagues, he cofounded the Metabolist Movement in 1960, whose members were known as Metabolists. It was a radical Japanese avant-garde movement pursuing the merging and recycling of architecture styles within an Asian context. The movement was very successful, peaking when its members received praise for the Takara Cotillion Beautillion at the Osaka World Expo 1970. The group was dismantled shortly thereafter.

Kurokawa had a daughter, potter Kako Matsuura, and a son, renowned photographer Mikio, from his first marriage to his college classmate. His second marriage was to actress Ayako Wakao (若尾 文子 Wakao Ayako), one of Japan's biggest movie stars of the 20th century. Kurokawa's younger brother works in industrial design but has also cooperated with Kurokawa on some architecture projects.

Kurokawa was the founder and president of Kisho Kurokawa Architect & Associates, established 8 April 1962. The enterprise's head office is in Tokyo with branch offices in Osaka, Nagoya, Astana, Kuala Lumpur, Beijing and Los Angeles. The company is registered with the Japanese government as a "First Class Architects Office."

Although he had practiced the concept of sustainable and eco-minded architecture for four decades, Kisho Kurokawa became more adamant about environmental protection in his latter years. In 2007, he ran for governor of Tokyo and then for a seat in the House of Councillors in the 2007 Japanese House of Councillors election. Although not elected, Kisho Kurokawa successfully established the Green Party to help provide environmental protection.  Also in 2007, Kurokawa created the structure of the Anaheim University Kisho Kurokawa Green Institute, which helps to develop environmentally-conscious business practices.  Kurokawa was a stakeholder and founding Chair of the Executive Advisory Board of the Anaheim, California-based university since 1998 and his wife Ayako Wakao-Kurokawa serves as Honorary Chairman of the institute.

Kurokawa wrote extensively on philosophy and architecture and lectured widely. He wrote that there are two traditions inherent in any culture: the visible and the invisible. His work, he claimed, carried the invisible tradition of Japan. In 1972, he received a grant from the Graham Foundation to deliver a lecture at the Museum of Science and Industry in Chicago.

Looking at his architecture—particularly at metabolism—tradition may not appear to be present, but, underneath the hard skin of the surface, his work is indeed Japanese. However, it is difficult to claim that the modern technologies and material he called on was inherited from the Japanese tradition and that the traditional forms of Japanese architecture can be recognized in his contemporary concrete or steel towers. Yet, Kurokawa's architecture evolved from the Japanese tradition, and there is a Japanese aesthetic in the context of his work. His architecture focused on keeping traditional Japanese concepts invisible, especially materiality, impermanence, receptivity and detail. Kurokawa specifically referred to these four factors in his discussions of new wave Japanese Architecture.

He died of heart failure on October 12, 2007; he was 73.

Key architectural concepts

Impermanence 

Kurokawa noted that, with the exception of Kyoto and Kanazawa, most Japanese cities were destroyed during World War II. When Western cities are destroyed, brick and stone remained as proof of their past existence. Sadly, remarks Kurokawa, Japan's cities were mostly built of wood and natural elements, so they burnt to ashes and disappeared completely. He also noted that both Edo (now Tokyo) and Kyoto were almost entirely destroyed during several battles of the Warring States period in the 15th and 16th centuries. The shifting of power caused parts of Japan to be destroyed. On the same note, historically speaking, Japan's cities have almost yearly been hit with natural disasters such as earthquakes, typhoons, floods and volcanic eruptions. This continuous destruction of buildings and cities has given the Japanese population, in Kurokawa's words, “an uncertainty about existence, a lack of faith in the visible, a suspicion of the eternal.”

In addition, the four seasons are very clearly marked in Japan, and the changes through the year are dramatic. Time, then, in Japanese culture is a precious entity that forces every candle, every being, every entity to fade at one point in time. The idea that buildings and cities should seem as natural as possible and that they should be in harmony with the rest of nature, since it is only temporarily there, helped create the tradition of making buildings and cities of “temporary” structure.

This idea of impermanence was reflected in Kurokawa's work during the Metabolism Movement. Buildings were built to be removable, interchangeable and adaptable. The concept of impermanence influence his work toward being in open systems, both in time and space.

Materiality 

Kurokawa explains that the Japanese tried to exploit the natural textures and colors of materials used in a building. The traditional tea room was intentionally built of only natural materials such as earth and sand, paper, the stems and leaves of plants, and small trees. Trees from a person's own backyard were preferred for the necessary timbers. All artificial colors were avoided, and the natural colors and texture of materials were shown to their best advantage. This honesty in materials stemmed from the idea that nature is already beautiful in itself. The Japanese feel that food tastes better, wood looks better, materials are better when natural. There is a belief that maximum enjoyment comes from the natural state.

This tradition on materiality was alive in Kurokawa's work which treated iron as iron, aluminum as aluminum, and made the most of the inherent finish of concrete. The tradition of honesty of materiality is present in Kurokawa's capsule building. In it, he showed technology with “no artificial colors." The capsule, escalator unit, elevator unit and pipe and ductwork were all exterior and exposed. Kurokawa opened structures and made no attempt to hide the connective elements, believing that beauty was inherent in each of the individual parts. This bold approach created a texture of elements that became the real materiality of the whole.

Receptivity 
The notion of receptivity is a crucial Japanese idea—possibly a “tradition." Kurokawa stated that Japan is a small country. For more than a thousand years, the Japanese had an awareness of neighboring China and Korea and, in the modern age, Portugal, Great Britain and America, to name a few. The only way for a small country like Japan to avoid being attacked by these empires was to make continuous attempts to absorb foreign cultures for study and, while establishing friendly relations with the larger nations, preserve its own identity. This receptivity is the aspect that allowed Japan to grow from a farming island into an imperial nation, first using Chinese political systems and Chinese advancement, then Western techniques and knowledge. Japan eventually surpassed China and stumbled upon itself during World War II. After the war, Japan, using this same perspective absorbed American culture and technology.

Kurokawa's architecture follows the string of receptivity but, at one point, tries to diverge and find its own identity. At first, Kurokawa's work followed the Modern Movement that was introduced in Japan by Tange, Isozaki and their peers. Tange showed the world that Japan could build modern buildings. His peers followed and continued the style. Then at one point in the 1960s, Kurokawa and a small group of architects began a new wave of contemporary Japanese architecture, believing that previous solutions and imitations were not satisfactory for the new era: life was not present in Modernism. They labeled their approach “metabolism." Kurokawa's work became receptive “to his own philosophy, the Principle of Life." (He saw architecture and cities as a dynamic process where parts needed to be ready for change. He mostly used steel in open frames and units that were prefabricated and interchangeable.)

Detail 
Kurokawa explained that the attention paid to detail in Japanese work derived essentially from the typical attempt to express individuality and expertise. In Japan the execution of details was a process of working not from the whole to the parts but from the parts to the whole. Every wood connection in a house was carefully crafted from the inside out. Japan is a country that moved from a non-industrial country to a fully industrial nation in less than 50 years, during the Meiji revolution. This sharp jump from producing goods by craftsmen to industrially realized production was so rapid that the deep-rooted tradition of fine craftsmanship as a statement of the creator did not disappear. As a result, the Japanese maker continues to be instilled with a fastidious preoccupation for fine details, which can be seen in contemporary architecture, art and industry. The attention to detail, an integral part of Japan's tradition, forms a uniquely indigenous aesthetic.

Similarly, Kurokawa's architecture features carefully detailed connections and finishes. He confessed: “This attention to detail is also an important key to understand my own architecture. The belief in the importance of details also suggests the new hierarchy.” Kurokawa believed that, while Western architecture and cities have been organized with a hierarchy from the infrastructure to the parts and details, his new approach to contemporary Japanese architecture focused on the autonomy of parts.

Sustainability 
In 1958, Kisho Kurokawa predicted a “Transition from the Age of the Machine to the Age of Life,” and has continually utilized such key words of life principles as metabolism (metabolize and recycle), ecology, sustainability, symbiosis, intermediate areas (ambiguity) and Hanasuki (Splendor of Wabi) in order to call for new styles to be implemented by society.  For four decades, Kisho Kurokawa created eco-friendly and sustainable architectural projects.  In 2003 he was awarded the Dedalo-Minosse International Prize (Grand Prix) for his creation of the Kuala Lumpur International Airport in Malaysia and KLIA is the first and only airport in the world to receive the United Nations' Green Globe 21 certification for the airport's commitment to environmental responsibility each year since 2004.

Anaheim University Kisho Kurokawa Green Institute 
The Anaheim University Kisho Kurokawa Green Institute was conceived of by Kisho Kurokawa and established in Kisho Kurokawa's honor in 2008. The institute offers online Certificate, Diploma, Master of Business Administration (MBA) and Doctor of Business Administration (DBA) degree programs in Sustainable Management.

Projects 
(organized by the year of completion)

1970s 
 Takara Beautilion, Theme Pavilion, and Toshiba IHI Pavilion, for Expo '70 (Osaka, 1970)
 Nakagin Capsule Tower (Ginza, Tokyo, 1970–1972, demolished 2022) 
 Capsule House K, Karuizawa, Japan (1974)
 Sony Tower (Osaka, 1972–1976)
 Tateshina Planetarium (Hiroshima, 1976)
 Headquarters of the Japanese Red Cross Society (Tokyo, 1975–1977)
 National Museum of Ethnology (Osaka, 1973–1977)
 Vitosha New Otani (Sofia, Bulgaria, 1974–1979)

1980s 

 Saitama Prefectural Museum of Modern Art (Saitama, 1978–1982)
 National Bunraku Theater (Osaka, 1979–1983)
 Wacoal Kojimachi Building (Tokyo, 1982–1984)
 Chokaso (Tokyo, 1985–1987)
 Nagoya City Art Museum (Nagoya, 1983–1987)
 Japanese-German Center of Berlin (Berlin, 1985–1988)
 Central Plaza 1, Brisbane, Australia
 Osaka Prefectural Government Offices (Osaka, 1988)
 Hiroshima City Museum of Contemporary Art (Hiroshima, 1988–1989)

1990s 

 Chinese-Japanese Youth Center (Beijing, 1987–1990)
 Okinawa Prefectural Government Headquarters (Okinawa, 1988–1990)
 The Sporting Club at Illinois Center (Chicago, 1987–1990)
 Melbourne Central (Melbourne, Australia, 1986–1991)
 Miki House New Office Building (Osaka, 1985–1991)
 Nara City Museum of Photography (Nara, 1989–1991)
 Louvain-La-Neuve Museum (Belgium, 1990–1992)
 Pacific Tower (Paris, France, 1988–1992)
 Lane Crawford Place (Singapore, 1990–1993)
 Senkantei (Hyōgo, 1992–1993)
 Ehime Museum of Science (Ehime, 1991–1994)
 Ishibashi Junior High School (Tochigi, 1992–1994)
 The Museum of Modern Art Wakayama/Wakayama Prefectural Museum (Wakayama, 1990–1994)
 Hotel Kyocera (Kagoshima, 1991–1995)
 Kibi-cho City Hall/Kibi Dome (Wakayama, 1993–1995)
 Republic Plaza (Singapore, 1986–1995)
 Fukui City Museum of Art (Fukui, 1993–1996)
 Softopia Japan (Gifu, 1990–1996)
 Fujinomiya Golf Club (Fujinomiya, Shizuoka, 1994–1997)
 Kashima-machi City Hall (Kumamoto, 1995–1997)
 Shiga Kogen Roman Art Museum (Yamanouchi, 1994–1997)
 Kuala Lumpur International Airport (Sepang, Malaysia, 1992–1998)
 New Wing of the Van Gogh Museum (Amsterdam, Netherlands, 1990–1998)
 Amber Hall (Kuji, 1996–1999)
 O Residence (Tokyo, 1997–1999)

2000s 

 Fukui Prefectural Dinosaur Museum (Katsuyama, 1996–2000)
 Osaka International Convention Center (Osaka, 1994–2000)
 Oita Stadium (Ōita, 1996–2001, used for the Football World Cup 2002)
 KL Sentral (Kuala Lumpur, 1994-2001) 
 Toyota Stadium (Toyota City, 1997–2001)
 Astana International Airport (T2 - Domestic Terminal), (Astana, Kazakhstan, 2000–2003)
 The National Art Center, Tokyo, Roppongi, Tokyo, 2000–2005)
 Campus of Kyushu University (Fukuoka, 2003–2005)
 Singapore Flyer (Singapore, 2005–2008)
 Fusionopolis Phase 1 (Singapore, 2006)
Zhengzhou International Convention and Exhibition Centre (Zhengzhou, China, 2002–2005)
 Design and Master Plan of Kazakhstan's New Capital (Astana, delayed due to budget problems)
 Krestovsky Stadium (St. Petersburg, 2006–2017)
 Trade Center (Yekaterinburg, 2007)
 Maggie's Cancer Care Centre, Singleton Hospital, Swansea (proposed)

Awards 
 Gold Medal, Académie d'Architecture, France (1986)
 Richard Neutra Award, California State Polytechnic University, Pomona (1988)
 48th Art Academy Award, highest award for artists and architects in Japan (1992)
 Renaming The Art Institute of Chicago to the Kisho Kurokawa Gallery of Architecture (1994)
 Pacific Rim Award, American Institute of Architects, Los Angeles chapter (first awarded, 1997)
 Doctorate Honoris Causa in Humanities, Anaheim University (1998)
 Honorary Fellow, Royal Institute of British Architects, United Kingdom
 Honorary Member, Union of Architects, Bulgaria
 Honorary Doctorate of Architecture by Universiti Putra Malaysia (UPM), Malaysia (2002)
 Dedalo-Minosse International Prize (Grand Prix) for Kuala Lumpur International Airport, Malaysia (2003–2004)
 Certification for a sustainable airport, Green Globe 21, United Nations, for Kuala Lumpur International Airport (2003)
 Walpole Medal of Excellence, United Kingdom (2005)
 Shungdu Friendship Award, China (2005)
 International Architecture Award, The Chicago Athenaeum Museum (2006)

Notes and references

External links 

 Kisho Kurokawa architect & associates
 Exhibition"Kisho Kurokawa" Official Website
 Sketches by Kisho Kurokawa
 Obituary in The Times, 24 October 2007
 Kisho Kurokawa on the Nakagin Capsule Building (Video)
 Kisho Kurokawa on Building the National Art Center (Video)
 The Anaheim University Kisho Kurokawa Green Institute
 Capsule Inn Osaka, designed by Kisho Kurokawa

1934 births
2007 deaths
People from Aichi Prefecture
Kyoto University alumni
University of Tokyo alumni
Japanese architects
Japanese political candidates
Tokyo gubernatorial candidates
Members of Nippon Kaigi